The Museum of Taipa and Coloane History is a museum in Taipa, Macau, China.

History
The museum building used to be a public administration building named Island Municipal Council Building. It used to serve as the administrative center of the government of Portuguese Macau and played an important role in developing the area. In 2002, the building was renovated. Excavations were being done until 2004 around the building area. Basic preparation for exhibitions were done in 2005 and the renovation was finally completed in March 2006. The museum was opened on 7 May 2006.

Architecture
The museum building is a 1920s green Portuguese building.

Exhibitions
There are nine galleries in total inside the museum. On the first floor, the museum displays excavated relics and other artifacts. On the second floor, there are religious objects, handicrafts and architectural models.

See also
 List of museums in Macau

References

2006 establishments in Macau
Museums established in 2006
Museums in Macau
Taipa